Forces of Nature is a 1999 American romantic comedy film directed by Bronwen Hughes, and starring Ben Affleck and Sandra Bullock.

Plot
Ben Holmes is a "blurb" writer responsible for writing the short introductions on the sleeves of hardcover books. On his way from his home in New York City to Savannah, Georgia for his wedding to Bridget, he is already anxious about flying. His nerves are worsened when he's seated next to Sarah, a free-spirited drifter who begins to talk to Ben immediately. On takeoff, a bird flies into one of the engines, causing a flameout. Now terrified to get on another plane, along with almost everyone else who was on board, Ben agrees to rent a car with Sarah, who also needs to get to Savannah within a few days, and another passenger, Vic.

Numerous obstacles begin to arise to prevent Ben from getting to his wedding. First, Vic begins smoking marijuana on the road, which leads to the three being arrested. Ben and Sarah are able to get released and buy train tickets to Georgia. Ben and Sarah share a moment on top of the train car, screaming into the picturesque landscape while the train is stopped, only to discover once they climb down that they've entered the wrong car and are now on their way to Chicago.

They disembark from the moving train and escape from a rain storm in a KMart, where they buy dry clothes and bond while discussing Ben's mixed feelings about getting married. Sarah reveals that she's been married twice and is traveling to Savannah to collect a large sum of money from the sale of a bagel shop that she opened with her estranged husband, Carl.

The next day, Sarah discovers Carl attempting to thwart the sale of the bagel shop, so she asks Ben to pretend to be her husband when they get to Savannah, explaining that she has a 10 year-old son from her first marriage that she hasn't seen in two years and wants to give him the money from the sale as a way to mend fences between them. He agrees, and she convinces him to pretend he's a surgeon and they're a married couple to charm their way onto a bus of retirees headed to Florida led by Joe.

At the first overnight stop, Ben finds himself increasingly attracted to Sarah. He encounters his best man, Alan and Bridget's maid of honor, Debbie in the hotel lobby. Ben leaves to find Sarah, but Debbie confronts him after one of the retirees refers to Sarah as his wife. Furious, Debbie returns to Savannah with Alan to reveal all to Bridget.

In their hotel room, Ben angrily blames Sarah for disrupting his life. She accuses him of being afraid to live his life honestly. They begin to kiss, but Ben stops himself and they leave to collect the money his parents have wired him to get home, only to discover the bank is burning down. Ben and Sarah both begin laughing hysterically, wondering what else could go wrong, and begin kissing again. Back at the hotel, they're confronted by the retirees, who have discovered their lie, so they flee.

Sarah recalls seeing a car for sale in town for a low price, and suggests she striptease in a local bar to raise the money to buy it. The bartender, however, asks Ben to dance instead, and they realize they've walked into a gay bar. Ben is nervous at first, but soon gets into the dance and earns them enough money to buy the car.

On the road to Savannah, Ben tells Sarah he's prepared to call the wedding off, but Sarah tells him he's known her only for a few days and it would be a crazy thing to do. A hurricane approaches Savannah, and the harsh weather forces Ben and Sarah to abandon the car and run the rest of the way to the wedding. Ben finds Bridget and realizes he does love her and wants to spend his life with her. Sarah witnesses their reunion and leaves quietly.

Ben and Bridget go on their honeymoon and get married in Hawaii. Sarah visits her son and reconciles with him. Ben states in voiceover that he hopes that wherever Sarah is that she's found happiness.

Cast

Production
Filming took place over three days at South of the Border, a tourist attraction near Dillon, South Carolina, and in Savannah, Georgia. The Joseph Johnson House, a private home on Craven Street in Beaufort, South Carolina known as "The Castle", was used as the Cahill house.

Reception
On Rotten Tomatoes, the film has an approval rating of 45% based on 66 reviews, with an average rating of 5.3/10. The website's critics consensus reads, "A distinct lack of chemistry between Ben Affleck and Sandra Bullock, coupled with a screwball sensibility that's a touch too screwy, scupper Forces of Natures modest ambition to serve up romantic charm." On Metacritic, the film has a weighted average score of 46 out of 100, based on 26 critics, indicating "mixed or average reviews". Audiences surveyed by CinemaScore gave the film an average grade of "B−" on scale of A+ to F.

References

External links

1999 films
1999 romantic comedy-drama films
American romantic comedy-drama films
1990s English-language films
DreamWorks Pictures films
Films shot in Virginia
Films shot in Jacksonville, Florida
Films shot in South Carolina
Films shot in North Carolina
Films shot in New Jersey
Films shot in Tennessee
Films set in Georgia (U.S. state)
Films shot in Savannah, Georgia
Films set in New York City
Films directed by Bronwen Hughes
Films with screenplays by Marc Lawrence
Films scored by John Powell
1990s American films